Longoseius is a genus of mites in the family Digamasellidae. There are about nine described species in Longoseius.

Species
These nine species belong to the genus Longoseius:
 Longoseius aberrans (Hirschmann, 1960)
 Longoseius brachypoda (Hurlbutt, 1967)
 Longoseius cuniculus Chant, 1961
 Longoseius longuloides Hirschmann & Wisniewski, 1982
 Longoseius longulus (Hirschmann, 1960)
 Longoseius longus (Hirschmann, 1954)
 Longoseius nobilis (Barilo, 1989)
 Longoseius ornatosimilis (Shcherbak, 1980)
 Longoseius ornatus (Hirschmann, 1960)

References

Mesostigmata